Renegade III: The Final Chapter is a scrolling beat'em up computer game released on the Amstrad CPC, Commodore 64, MSX and ZX Spectrum systems in 1989 by Ocean Software under their "Imagine" label. The game is a sequel to Target: Renegade which itself is a sequel to the arcade game Renegade.

Unlike the first two games, Renegade III follows the character known only as "Renegade" as he travels through time to rescue his captured girlfriend. It also dropped the two-player mode found in the previous title.

Reception
Though the game was highly praised by critics, receiving high scores in several prominent gaming publications such as a 91% score being awarded by Crash, and 84% in C+VG, it was derided by fans who criticised the game's storyline, lack of deep gameplay, weapons, glitches, poor physics and lack of a two-player option.

The Spanish magazine Microhobby valued the game with the following scores: Originality: 30% Graphics: 80% Motion: 80% Sound: 80% Difficulty: 100% Addiction: 80%

Amiga version 
A Commodore Amiga version was developed but never released. It was leaked years later.

References

External links
 

1989 video games
Amstrad CPC games
Beat 'em ups
Commodore 64 games
Cancelled Amiga games
MSX games
Ocean Software games
Side-scrolling beat 'em ups
Video games about time travel
Video game sequels
ZX Spectrum games
Video games developed in the United Kingdom